Thomas Martyn (1735–1825) was an English botanist.

Thomas Martyn may also refer to:

 Thomas J. C. Martyn (1896–1979), British aviator, journalist, founder of American magazine Newsweek
 Thomas Martyn (zoologist) (c. 1760–1816), English zoologist, conchologist and entomologist
 Tommy Martyn (born 1971), rugby league footballer who played in the 1980s, 1990s and 2000s, and coached in the 2000s
 Thomas Martyn (rugby league) (1946/47–2016), rugby league footballer who played in the 1970s
 Thomas Óge Martyn (died 1577), mayor of Galway
 Thomas Martin (died 1593) (1521–1593), or Martyn, English lawyer, controversialist and politician

See also
 Thomas Martin (disambiguation)
 Thomas Marten (disambiguation)